Louise Boyd may refer to:

 Louise Arner Boyd (1887–1972), American explorer of Greenland and the Arctic
 Louise Esther Vickroy Boyd (1827–1909), American writer